This Is My Life is a 1992 American comedy-drama film that marked the directorial debut of screenwriter Nora Ephron. The screenplay, written by Ephron and her sister, Delia Ephron, is based on the book, This Is Your Life, by Meg Wolitzer.

Plot

Dottie Ingels works at a cosmetics counter but aspires to be a stand-up comedian. Ingels' Aunt Harriet dies and leaves the family her home in Queens, which Ingels then sells to move to an apartment in Manhattan. Ingels' comedy career starts to take off with the help of her agent, Arnold Moss and Moss's assistant, Claudia Curtis. Ingels' children, Erica and Opal get angry at Dottie because they hardly ever see her. Erica and Opal then run away to find their father upstate in Albany, whom Opal doesn't even remember, being only 1 or 2 years old when he left them.

Cast

Production
The film was at Columbia Pictures but was put into turnaround in 1990. Ephron allegedly asked Jon Peters if he had read the script who answered that "I've made over 60 movies. I don't have to read a script to know whether it works or not."

The character portrayed by Aykroyd, Arnold Moss, is based on the famous New York talent agent Sam Cohn, and has some of the eccentricities for which Cohn was known, such as a habit of eating paper.

Soundtrack 
The film's soundtrack was performed by Carly Simon and released on Qwest Records. Although the album failed to chart, the single "Love of My Life" reached No. 16 on the Billboard Adult Contemporary chart.

Reception 

This Is My Life was met with lukewarm critical responses. On Rotten Tomatoes, it has an approval of 36% rating based on reviews from 14 critics, with an average rating of 5.5/10.

Roger Ebert of the Chicago Sun-Times gave it 3 out of 4.
Owen Gleiberman of Entertainment Weekly gave it a C+.

In 2020, David Sims of The Atlantic called it "the forgotten gem in Ephron’s filmmaking career".

Home media 
20th Century Fox released the film on DVD-R in 2012 as part of its Fox Cinema Archives line.

Sources 
 LeVasseur, Andrea "This Is My Life". Allmovie.

References

External links
 
 
 

1992 films
1992 comedy-drama films
American comedy-drama films
Films set in New York City
1992 directorial debut films
20th Century Fox films
Films directed by Nora Ephron
Films produced by Lynda Obst
Films with screenplays by Nora Ephron
Films about sisters
Films about mother–daughter relationships
Films about comedians
Films about parenting
1990s English-language films
1990s American films